Carex supina, called the weak arctic sedge, is a species of flowering plant in the genus Carex, native to Alaska, western and central Canada, Minnesota, Greenland, central and eastern Europe, the Caucasus region, Central Asia, Siberia, the Himalaya, the Amur region, Manchuria, and Korea. It is often found in association with Festuca altaica and Poa glauca.

Subtaxa
The following varieties are currently accepted:
Carex supina var. spaniocarpa (Steud.) B.Boivin
Carex supina var. supina

References

supina
Plants described in 1803